GMMR is a four-letter acronym that can mean the following:

 Greater Mumbai Metropolitan Region in India
 Great Manmade River in Libya.